Petekkaya can refer to:

 Petekkaya, Bayburt
 Petekkaya, Çermik